The Most Reverend Rex Andrew Clement Alarcon, D.D., (born 6 August 1970 in Daet, Camarines Norte), is a Prelate of the Catholic church in the Philippines. He is the Bishop of Daet, with its seat at Daet, Camarines Norte. He succeeded Most Rev. Gilbert A. Garcera, DD, who was appointed Archbishop of Lipa in 2017.

Biography 

The Bishop, born to Juanita C. Clement and the late Armando A. Alarcon on August 6, 1970 in Daet, Camarines Norte, finished his grade school studies at the Naga Parochial School. He then finished his high school education and philosophy degree at the Holy Rosary Minor Seminary. After being ordained to the priesthood on November 9, 1996, he attained his licentiate and master's degree in theology from the University of Santo Tomas.

After ordination, he served as parochial vicar at the St. John the Evangelist Metropolitan Cathedral and Parish in Naga City, and professor-formator at the Holy Rosary Minor Seminary until 1997.

From 1997 to 1999 he served as secretary to then-archbishop Most Rev. Leonardo Z. Legaspi, OP, DD.

From 1999 and 2001 he studied at the Pontifical Gregorian University in Rome, Italy, where he obtained his licentiate in Church history. Upon his return, he became a professor at the Holy Rosary Minor Seminary.

Since 2002 he has been the director of the Stewardship Program of the Archdiocese of Caceres (SPARC). In 2007, he was appointed as the fourth director of his alma mater, the Naga Parochial School. Concurrently, he also served as president of the Catholic Educational Association of Caceres and Libmanan, as well as the Bicol Association of Catholic Schools.

In 2013, Archbishop Rolando J. Tria Tirona appointed him superintendent of the Catholic schools of the archdiocese. He also served as a member of the College of Consultants, and spokesperson for the archdiocese. Since 2016 he has been chairman of the National Advocacy Commission of the Catholic Educational Association of the Philippines.

Bishop of Daet 
After 22 years as a priest of the Archdiocese of Caceres, on 2 January 2019, Pope Francis appointed him as the fourth bishop of the Diocese of Daet.

He was ordained bishop on the Feast of Saint Joseph, 19 March 2019, at the Naga Metropolitan Cathedral, with Most Rev. Adolfo Tito Yllana, D.D., Apostolic Nuncio to Australia, and Most Rev. Manolo A. de los Santos, D.D., Bishop of Virac, as principal co-ordaining prelates. Apostolic Nuncio Most Rev. Gabriele Giordano Caccia S.T.D., J.C.L., D.D. represented the Holy See.

Bishop Alarcon was installed a day later on 20 March 2019 at the Cathedral of the Most Holy Trinity, and was attended by some 2,000 people.

In May 2019, he joined the second batch of Philippine bishops who went to Rome for an Ad Limina visit to Pope Francis.

References 

1970 births
Living people
Filipino expatriates in Italy
Filipino Roman Catholics
Pontifical Gregorian University alumni
21st-century Roman Catholic bishops in the Philippines